A Family is a 2010 Danish drama film directed by Pernille Fischer Christensen. It was nominated for the Golden Bear at the 60th Berlin International Film Festival.

Cast
 Jesper Christensen as Rikard Rheinwald
 Anne Louise Hassing as Sanne
 Pilou Asbæk as Peter
 Lene Maria Christensen as Ditte
 Line Kruse as Chrisser
 Coco Hjardemaal as Line
 Gustav Fischer Kjærulff as Vimmer

References

External links
 
 A Family at DFI.dk 
 

2010 films
2010 drama films
2010s Danish-language films
Films directed by Pernille Fischer Christensen
Danish drama films